In mathematics, the special unitary group of degree , denoted , is the Lie group of  unitary matrices with determinant 1.

The more general unitary matrices may have complex determinants with absolute value 1, rather than real 1 in the special case.

The group operation is matrix multiplication. The special unitary group is a normal subgroup of the unitary group , consisting of all  unitary matrices. It is itself a subgroup of the general linear group, .

The groups  are important in quantum computing, as they represent the possible quantum logic gate operations in a quantum circuit with  qubits and thus  basis states. (Alternatively, the more general unitary group  can be used, since
multiplying by a global phase factor  does not change the expectation values of a quantum operator.)

The simplest case, is the trivial group, having only a single element. The group  is isomorphic to the group of quaternions of norm 1, and is thus diffeomorphic to the 3-sphere.

Properties
The special unitary group  is a strictly real Lie group (vs. a more general complex Lie group). Its dimension as a real manifold is  Topologically, it is compact and simply connected. Algebraically, it is a simple Lie group (meaning its Lie algebra is simple; see below).

A maximal torus of rank  is given by the set of diagonal matrices with determinant 1. The Weyl group of SU(n) is the symmetric group , which is represented by signed permutation matrices (the signs being necessary to ensure the determinant is 1).

Particle physicists often use a different, equivalent representation: The set of traceless Hermitian  complex matrices with Lie bracket given by  times the commutator.

Lie algebra

The Lie algebra  of  consists of  skew-Hermitian matrices with trace zero. This (real) Lie algebra has dimension . More information about the structure of this Lie algebra can be found below in the section "Lie algebra structure."

Fundamental representation
In the physics literature, it is common to identify the Lie algebra with the space of trace-zero Hermitian (rather than the skew-Hermitian) matrices. With this convention, one can then choose generators  that are traceless Hermitian complex  matrices, where:

As a consequence, the commutator is:

and the corresponding anticommutator is:

The conventional normalization condition is

Adjoint representation
In the -dimensional adjoint representation, the generators are represented by ×  matrices, whose elements are defined by the structure constants themselves:

The group SU(2)
 

Using matrix multiplication for the binary operation,  forms a group,

where the overline denotes complex conjugation.

Diffeomorphism with the 3-sphere S3

This is the equation of the 3-sphere S3. This can also be seen using an embedding: the map

Isomorphism with group of versors
Quaternions of norm 1 are called versors since they generate the rotation group SO(3):
The  matrix:

can be mapped to the quaternion

This map is in fact a group isomorphism. Additionally, the determinant of the matrix is the squared norm of the corresponding quaternion. Thus  is isomorphic to the group of versors.

Relation to spatial rotations 

Every versor is naturally associated to a spatial rotation in 3 dimensions, and the product of versors is associated to the composition of the associated rotations. Furthermore, every rotation arises from exactly two versors in this fashion. In short: there is a 2:1 surjective homomorphism from SU(2) to SO(3); consequently SO(3) is isomorphic to the quotient group SU(2)/{±I}, the manifold underlying SO(3) is obtained by identifying antipodal points of the 3-sphere  , and SU(2) is the universal cover of SO(3).

Lie algebra
The Lie algebra of  consists of  skew-Hermitian matrices with trace zero. Explicitly, this means

The Lie algebra is then generated by the following matrices,

which have the form of the general element specified above.

This can also be written as  using the Pauli matrices.

These satisfy the quaternion relationships      and   The commutator bracket is therefore specified by

They also serve as unit vectors for the description of our 3 spatial dimensions in loop quantum gravity. They also correspond to the Pauli X, Y, and Z gates, which are standard generators for the single qubit gates, corresponding to 3d-rotations about the axes of the Bloch sphere.

The group SU(3)

 is an 8-dimensional simple Lie group consisting of all  unitary matrices with determinant 1.

Topology
The group  is a simply-connected, compact Lie group. The stabilizer of an arbitrary point in the sphere is isomorphic to SU(2), which topologically is a 3-sphere. It then follows that SU(3) is a fiber bundle over the base  with fiber . Since the fibers and the base are simply connected, the simple connectedness of SU(3) then follows by means of a standard topological result (the long exact sequence of homotopy groups for fiber bundles).

 

Then, all such transition functions are classified by homotopy classes of maps
 

This can be shown by looking at the induced long exact sequence on homotopy groups.

Representation theory
Descriptions of these representations, from the point of view of its complexified Lie algebra , may be found in the articles on Lie algebra representations or the Clebsch–Gordan coefficients for SU(3).

Lie algebra

where , the Gell-Mann matrices, are the  analog of the Pauli matrices for :

These  span all traceless Hermitian matrices  of the Lie algebra, as required. Note that  are antisymmetric.

They obey the relations

or, equivalently,
.

The  are the structure constants of the Lie algebra, given by
 
while all other  not related to these by permutation are zero. In general, they vanish unless they contain an odd number of indices from the set {2, 5, 7}.

The symmetric coefficients  take the values
 

They vanish if the number of indices from the set {2, 5, 7} is odd.

 

where

Lie algebra structure
As noted above, the Lie algebra  of  consists of  skew-Hermitian matrices with trace zero.

A Cartan subalgebra then consists of the diagonal matrices with trace zero, which we identify with vectors in  whose entries sum to zero.

A choice of simple roots is

Its Cartan matrix is

Its Weyl group or Coxeter group is the symmetric group , the symmetry group of the -simplex.

Generalized special unitary group
The field  can be replaced by a commutative ring, in which case the vector space is replaced by a free module.

satisfy

The standard choice for  when  is
 

Example
An important example of this type of group is the Picard modular group  which acts (projectively) on complex hyperbolic space of degree two, in the same way that  acts (projectively) on real hyperbolic space of dimension two.

Important subgroups
In physics the special unitary group is used to represent bosonic symmetries. In theories of symmetry breaking it is important to be able to find the subgroups of the special unitary group.

For completeness, there are also the orthogonal and symplectic subgroups,

See spin group, and simple Lie groups for E6, E7, and G2.

The group SU(1,1)
 where  denotes the complex conjugate of the complex number .

An early appearance of this group was as the "unit sphere" of coquaternions, introduced by James Cockle in 1852. Let

For both quaternions and coquaternions, all scalar quantities are treated as implicit multiples of   and notated as  .

The coquaternion  with scalar , has conjugate  similar to Hamilton's quaternions. The quadratic form is 

Note that the 2-sheet hyperboloid  corresponds to the imaginary units in the algebra so that any point  on this hyperboloid can be used as a pole of a sinusoidal wave according to Euler's formula.

The variability of the pole of a wave, as noted in studies of polarization, might view elliptical polarization as an exhibit of the elliptical shape of a wave with  The Poincaré sphere model used since 1892 has been compared to a 2-sheet hyperboloid model.

since in projective coordinates 

Writing  complex number arithmetic shows

where 
Therefore,  so that their ratio lies in the open disk.

See also

 Unitary group
 Projective special unitary group, 
 Orthogonal group
 Generalizations of Pauli matrices
 Representation theory of SU(2)

Footnotes

Citations

References
 
 

Lie groups
Mathematical physics